The Mr. Maine Basketball honor recognizes the top high school basketball player in the state of Maine. The award is presented annually by the Maine Association of Basketball Coaches.
The award is given to a senior player who best demonstrates basketball skills, makes significant impact on his team, shows leadership and respect for the game, and demonstrates good sportsmanship and citizenship both on and off the court.  The annual selection is made by a 5-person committee composed of three media representatives and two retired coaches.

Award winners

Schools with multiple winners

See also
Miss Maine Basketball

References

Mr. and Miss Basketball awards
High school sports in Maine
Awards established in 1988
1988 establishments in Maine
Lists of people from Maine
Maine sports-related lists